The Baltimore Orioles are a Major League Baseball franchise based in Baltimore, Maryland. They play in the American League East division, and were previously known in earlier years as the “Milwaukee Brewers” (1901) and “St. Louis Browns” (1902 to 1953) pitchers for the Orioles have thrown ten no-hitters in franchise history. A no-hitter is officially recognized by Major League Baseball only "when a pitcher (or pitchers) allows no hits during the entire course of a game, which consists of at least nine innings", though one or more batters "may reach base via a walk, an error, a hit by pitch, a passed ball or wild pitch on strike three, or catcher's interference". No-hitters of less than nine complete innings were previously recognized by the league as official; however, several rule alterations in 1991 changed the rule to its current form. No perfect games, a special subcategory of no-hitter, have been thrown in Orioles history. As defined by Major League Baseball, "in a perfect game, no batter reaches any base during the course of the game."

Earl Hamilton threw the first no-hitter in Orioles history on August 30, 1912; the most recent no-hitter was thrown by John Means on May 5, 2021. No-hitters have been thrown by five left-handed starting pitchers and five right-handers. Seven no-hitters were thrown at home and three on the road. There have been two no-hitters in April, four in May, one in July, two in August, and one in September. The longest interval between no-hitters was 36 years from May 6, 1917 (Bob Groom) to May 6, 1953 (Bobo Holloman). The shortest interval was one day, May 5, 1917 (Ernie Koob) to May 6, 1917 (Groom). The franchise no-hit the Oakland Athletics (formerly “Philadelphia Athletics”) the most, three times, by Holloman in 1953, Jim Palmer in 1969, and a combined no-hitter by Milacki, Flanagan, Williamson, and Olson in 1991. In two no-hitters, the team allowed at least one run: by Hamilton in 1912 (which was a loss) and a combined no-hitter by Steve Barber and Stu Miller in 1967. The most baserunners allowed in a no-hitter was a combined no-no by Barber and Miller, who allowed 14 in a 2–1 loss to the Detroit Tigers in 1967. Of the ten no-hitters, two have been won by a score of 1–0 and two by a score of 6–0, more common than any other result. The largest margin of victory was an 8–0 win by Palmer in 1969. The smallest margin of victory was a 1–0 wins by Koob in 1917 and Hoyt Wilhelm in 1958.

The umpire is an integral part of any no-hitter. The umpire makes any decision “which involves judgment, such as, but not limited to, whether a batted ball is fair or foul, whether a pitch is a strike or a ball, or whether a runner is safe or out… [the umpire’s judgment on such matters] is final." Part of the duties of the umpire making calls at home plate includes defining the strike zone, which "is defined as that area over homeplate (sic) the upper limit of which is a horizontal line at the midpoint between the top of the shoulders and the top of the uniform pants, and the lower level is a line at the hollow beneath the kneecap.” These calls define every baseball game and are therefore integral to the completion of any no-hitter. Eight different umpires presided over each of the franchise’s ten no-hitters.

The manager is another integral part of a no-hitter. For every game, the manager determines the starting rotation (who pitches in each game) as well as the batting order and defensive lineup. A manager’s decisions can contribute to a no-hitter. Eight different managers have overseen the franchise’s ten no-hitters.

List of no-hitters in Browns/Orioles history

References

No-hitters
Baltimore Orioles